Artem Kovernikov (born 1 July 2000) is a Ukrainian football defender who played for Dukla Prague.

Career statistics

Club
.

Notes

References

2000 births
Living people
Ukrainian footballers
Ukrainian expatriate footballers
Association football defenders
Czech National Football League players
FC Arsenal Kyiv players
FK Dukla Prague players
Ukrainian expatriate sportspeople in the Czech Republic
Expatriate footballers in the Czech Republic